Rocky Joe Suhayda (born 1952) is an American neo-Nazi and far-right activist, who as
of 2017 was chairman of a fringe group that split from the American Nazi Party. He has held the office since at least 2000. He and his Party are based in Michigan.

Biography 
Suhayda graduated from Bentley High School in Livonia, Michigan, in 1969. He worked in the shipping and receiving department of the Garden City Osteopathic Hospital. Suhayda has run unsuccessfully for public office on several occasions, including for the Livonia School District and the Livonia City Council.

Suhayda was a member of the World Union of Free Enterprise National Socialists and the National Association for the Advancement of White People, and subsequently founded his own organization under the name of the American Nazi Party. Suhayda's organization claims a connection to the American Nazi Party founded by George Lincoln Rockwell in 1959, but it is officially a separate entity. He was a member of the National White People's Party in 1976, but resigned some point before 1979. As of 1979, he was the Chairman of a 12-member group called The National Front. Suhayda has stated that he represents a Livonia chapter of the Ku Klux Klan.

Shortly after the September 11 attacks, Suhayda stated that "if we were one-tenth as serious as the bin Laden terrorists, we just might start getting somewhere." In 2016, Suhayda stated on his radio show that a Donald Trump presidency could give American Nazis the chance to build a 'pro-white' political caucus similar to the Congressional Black Caucus. He publicly supported the appointment of Steve Bannon to the position of chief strategist in Donald Trump's White House.

References

1952 births
American neo-Nazis
Leaders of political parties in the United States
Living people
People from Livonia, Michigan
Politicians from Detroit
People from Eastpointe, Michigan
American Ku Klux Klan members
American people of Hungarian descent